A partial solar eclipse occurred on May 21, 1993. A solar eclipse occurs when the Moon passes between Earth and the Sun, thereby totally or partly obscuring the image of the Sun for a viewer on Earth. A partial solar eclipse occurs in the polar regions of the Earth when the center of the Moon's shadow misses the Earth.

Images

Related eclipses

Eclipses of 1993 
 A partial solar eclipse (north) on May 21.
 A total lunar eclipse (central, passing north of the axis) on June 4.
 A partial solar eclipse (south) on November 13.
 A total lunar eclipse (south) on November 29.

Solar eclipses 1993–1996

Saros 118 

It is a part of Saros cycle 118, repeating every 18 years, 11 days, containing 72 events. The series started with partial solar eclipse on May 24, 803 AD. It contains total eclipses from August 19, 947 AD through October 25, 1650, hybrid eclipses on November 4, 1668 and November 15, 1686, and annular eclipses from November 27, 1704 through April 30, 1957. The series ends at member 72 as a partial eclipse on July 15, 2083. The longest duration of total was 6 minutes, 59 seconds on May 16, 1398.

Metonic series

References

External links 
 NASA graphics
 Photo of eclipse from Novocheboksarsk, Chuvashia (in Russian). Metadata of photo

1993 5 21
1993 in science
1993 5 21
May 1993 events